Moritz von Aberle (25 April 1819 – 3 November 1875) was a German Catholic theologian.

Life 
Moritz von Aberle was born on 25 April 1819 at Rottum in Baden-Württemberg, Germany. He became a professor in the Obergymnasium at Ehingen in 1845, director of the Wilhelmstift in 1848, and a professor of moral theology and New Testament exegesis in the university at Tübingen in 1850, a position he retained till the day of his death. He died at Tübingen on 3 November 1875.

Career 
He had a considerable number of pupils in both branches, but he was especially devoted to Scriptural studies. He emphasized the activity of the human bearers of revelation, without changing it into a purely natural process. Von Aberle published the results of his investigations in a series of articles. The main thoughts of these articles were collected and published under the title "Introduction to the New Testament", by Dr. Paul Schanz (Freiburg, 1877). Aberle's view that the Gospels and the Book of Acts are apologetic writings, meeting certain needs of the Apostolic times, cannot be sustained. He took also an active part in the struggle for ecclesiastical liberty in Württemberg, and his strong newspaper articles forced the State to arrange Church matters on a tolerable basis.

References 

1819 births
1875 deaths
19th-century German Catholic theologians
19th-century German male writers
19th-century German writers
German male non-fiction writers
People from Biberach (district)